The BMW 1 Series (F40) is the third generation of the BMW 1 Series range of subcompact executive hatchback cars. Unlike the previous generation F20 1 Series, the F40 1 Series uses a front-wheel drive configuration and is only available as a 5-door hatchback.

Overview 
The F40 1 Series premiered at the 2019 Frankfurt Auto Show and launched on 28 September 2019. Built on the UKL2 platform, it shares the same front hood, fender panel, dashboard, and suspension as the 2 Series Gran Coupé.

Compared to its predecessor, the F40 1 Series is  shorter,  wider, and  taller. The F40 1 Series is also  lighter due to increased use of aluminium.

Petrol engines have a gasoline particulate filter, while diesel engines feature a diesel particulate filter and AdBlue selective catalytic reduction. All engines meet the Euro 6d-TEMP emissions standard.

118i, 116d, and 118d models come with 6-speed manual transmissions as standard. 118i and 116d models can be upgraded to a 7-speed Getrag 7DCT300 dual-clutch transmission, while an 8-speed Aisin automatic transmission is available for M135i xDrive, 128ti, 118d, and 120d xDrive models.

Equipment 
The F40 1 Series is available in Advantage, Luxury, Sport, and M Sport trim. Sport and Luxury models feature an M Sport Steering wheel, while M Sport models feature sport seats and M exterior styling. European models feature collision detection and lane departure warning with intervention as standard.

The F40 1 Series is available with iDrive 7.0 with two 10.25-inch displays. iDrive 7.0 features the voice-controlled BMW digital assistant which can control in-car functions and can be activated by saying "Hey BMW". A digital key also enables the vehicle to be unlocked using near-field communication by holding a smartphone near the door handle and the engine can be started by placing the smartphone in the wireless charging tray. The digital key can also be shared with up to five other smartphones.

Other options include gesture control, a windshield reflected head-up display, automatic parking, a panoramic sunroof, Apple CarPlay and Android Auto.

M135i xDrive models feature a limited slip differential, larger M Sport brakes, a strut bar, and a larger  diameter exhaust.

116-120 models with M Sport and 128-M135 models can be fitted with M Performance Parts. These include canards, a spoiler, a splitter, side skirts and rims. 116-120 models without M Sport can still be equipped with the M Performance rims and spoiler. However, to install the rest, they need to be converted to M Sport with the M Sport bumpers and trims. The M135i grille can be fitted to all F40 1er models.

Updates 
In October 2021 BMW revealed an updated M135i. It comes with retuned springs, dampers and trailing arm and control arm mounts. A hydromount was also added to attach the front wishbones and the camber has been increased for more grip. The artificial interior engine sound was loudened as well.

Models

Petrol engines

Diesel engines

Safety 
The 2019 1 Series scored five stars overall in its Euro NCAP test.

References

External links 
 Official website

Euro NCAP small family cars
1 Series
Cars introduced in 2019
2020s cars